The following highways are numbered 397:

Canada
Manitoba Provincial Road 397
Saskatchewan Highway 397
 Quebec Route 397

Ireland
R397 road (Ireland)

Japan
 Japan National Route 397

South Africa
R397 (South Africa)

Spain

Autovía A-397

United States
  Arkansas Highway 397
  Montana Secondary Highway 397 (former)
  Nevada State Route 397
 New York:
  New York State Route 397
  County Route 397 (Erie County, New York)
  Puerto Rico Highway 397
  Tennessee State Route 397
  Virginia State Route 397
  Washington State Route 397